The women's hammer throw event at the 2000 World Junior Championships in Athletics was held in Santiago, Chile, at Estadio Nacional Julio Martínez Prádanos on 17 and 18 October.

Medalists

Results

Final
18 October

Qualifications
17 October

Group A

Group B

Participation
According to an unofficial count, 32 athletes from 24 countries participated in the event.

References

Hammer throw
Hammer throw at the World Athletics U20 Championships